This is the list of Advanced Dungeons & Dragons 2nd edition monsters, an important element of that role-playing game. This list only includes monsters from official Advanced Dungeons & Dragons 2nd Edition supplements published by TSR, Inc. or Wizards of the Coast, not licensed or unlicensed third-party products such as video games or unlicensed Advanced Dungeons & Dragons 2nd Edition manuals.



Monsters in the 2nd edition Advanced Dungeons & Dragons
The second edition of the Advanced Dungeons & Dragons game featured both a higher number of books of monsters and more extensive monster descriptions than both earlier and later editions, with usually one page in length. Next to a description, monster entries in this edition contained standardized sections covering combat, their habit and society, and their role in the eco-system. While later editions gave the various creatures all the attributes which player characters had, 2nd edition only listed intelligence as a characteristic important for creating challenging encounters in the game.

The 2nd edition also used a unique format in the form of Monstrous Compendiums of loose sheets that could be collected in a folder, and allowed the combination of monster books together with individual monster pages from boxed sets. This format was abandoned again in 1993 in favor of bound books. In parallel with this change, the 2nd edition introduced colored images for each monster, which became standard in later editions of the game. Referencing Wizards of the Coast art director Dawn Murin, GameSpy author Allan Rausch found that until the 2nd edition the artwork depicting monsters was influenced by the popular culture of the late 1970s. As a result, creatures that were fearsome by description were not taken seriously due to ill-suited visuals. Likewise, humanoid monsters too closely resembled humans to be compelling. In the view of Rausch as well as Backstab reviewer Michaël Croitoriu, the Planescape setting marked a turning point for these shortcomings, which also had a significant impact on the presentation of the 3rd edition.

The second edition's monsters were based on original inventions, fantasy literature, and mythologies from various cultures. Many monsters were updated from earlier editions, but the 2nd edition also introduced a great number of new creatures.

Some types, such as devils and demons, were initially removed by TSR in response to a moral panic promoted by Patricia Pulling's advocacy group Bothered About Dungeons and Dragons (BADD). These were later reintroduced, sometimes with different names, to avoid complaints.

TSR 2102 – MC1 – Monstrous Compendium Volume One (1989)

TSR 2501 – Monstrous Compendium – Mystara Appendix (1994)

TSR 2153 – Monstrous Compendium – Ravenloft Appendix III: Creatures of Darkness (1994)

Monstrous Compendium Annuals

TSR 2433 – Dark Sun Monstrous Compendium Appendix II: Terrors Beyond Tyr (1995)

TSR 2613 – Planescape Monstrous Compendium Appendix II (1995)

TSR 2162 - Ravenloft Monstrous Compendium Appendices I & II (1996)

TSR 2524 – Savage Coast Monstrous Compendium Appendix (1996)

TSR 2635 – Planescape Monstrous Compendium Appendix III (1998)

TSR 3140 – Birthright – Blood Spawn: Creatures of Light and Shadow (2000)

Other sources
This section lists fictional creatures for AD&D 2nd Edition from various sources not explicitly dedicated to presenting monsters. Primarily, these are the separate sourcebooks and expansions for the Forgotten Realms, Al-Qadim and other campaign settings produced by TSR.

Spelljammer

Forgotten Realms

TSR1060 – Ruins of Undermountain (1991)
The Forgotten Realms Ruins of Undermountain boxed set included 8 unnumbered 5-hole punched loose-leaf pages of creature descriptions in Monstrous Compendium format.

TSR1066 – Maztica Campaign Set (1991)
The Maztica Campaign Set boxed set contained 4 new creatures in the standard Monstrous Compendium format, on pages 59–62 of the Maztica Alive booklet.

TSR9326 – The Drow of the Underdark (1991)
This 128-page softbound book provided additional details on the history, culture and society of the dark elves, and included 9 additional creature descriptions in Monstrous Compendium format on pages 113–127.

TSR9333 – Fires of Zatal (1991)
The Forgotten Realms adventure Fires of Zatal for the Maztica setting by Jeff Grubb and Tim Beach contained three new fictional creatures.

TSR1083 – Menzoberranzan (1992)
The Forgotten Realms Menzoberranzan boxed set included 7 pages of creature descriptions in Monstrous Compendium format, bound into the first book of the set (The City) on pages 88–94.

TSR1084 – Ruins of Myth Drannor (1993)
The Forgotten Realms The Ruins of Myth Drannor boxed set included 8 unnumbered 5-hole punched loose-leaf pages of creature descriptions in Monstrous Compendium format.

TSR1085 – Forgotten Realms Campaign Setting (1993)
The Forgotten Realms Campaign Setting (2nd edition) boxed set included 8 unnumbered 5-hole punched loose-leaf pages of creature descriptions in Monstrous Compendium format.

TSR1109 – City of Splendors (1994)
The Forgotten Realms City of Splendors boxed set included unnumbered 5-hole punched loose-leaf pages of creature descriptions in Monstrous Compendium format.

TSR9563 – Powers and Pantheons (1997)
The Forgotten Realms campaign expansion Powers & Pantheons by Eric L. Boyd contained next to the description of many deities also new creatures.

Dragonlance

TSR9294 – Dragon's Rest (1990)
The Dragonlance adventure Dragon's Rest by Rick Swan contained three new fictional creatures.

TSR9334 – Wild Elves (1991)
The Dragonlance adventure Wild Elves by Scott Bennie contained six new fictional creatures.

TSR9344 – Taladas: The Minotaurs (1991)
The Dragonlance game accessory Taladas: The Minotaurs by Colin McComb contained several new creatures.

TSR9382 – Flint's Axe (1992)
The Dragonlance adventure Flint's Axe by Tim Beach contained a new creature.

Al-Qadim

TSR1077 – Land of Fate (1992)
The Al-Qadim Land of Fate boxed set contained 8 unnumbered 5-hole punched loose-leaf pages in Monstrous Compendium format.

TSR9366 – Golden Voyages (1992)
The Al-Qadim Golden Voyages boxed set, by David "Zeb" Cook, contained 4 unnumbered 5-hole punched loose-leaf pages in Monstrous Compendium format, each with a full-page image of the creature described on the back.

TSR1091 – City of Delights (1993)
The Al-Qadim City of Delights boxed set contained 8 unnumbered 5-hole punched loose-leaf pages in Monstrous Compendium format.

TSR9431 – Assassin Mountain (1993)
The Al-Qadim Assassin Mountain boxed set contained 4 unnumbered 5-hole punched loose-leaf pages in Monstrous Compendium format.

All of the fictional creatures described in this accessory are included in the Monstrous Compendium Annual Volume One, above, and are not reproduced here.

TSR9433 – Secrets of the Lamp (1993)
The Al-Qadim Secrets of the Lamp boxed set contained 4 unnumbered 5-hole punched loose-leaf pages in Monstrous Compendium format.

All of the fictional creatures described in this set are included in either the Monstrous Compendium Annual Volume One or the Planescape Monstrous Compendium Appendix, above, and are not reproduced here.

TSR9440 – Ruined Kingdoms (1994)
The Al-Qadim Ruined Kingdoms boxed set, by Steven Kurtz, contained an 8-page booklet with non-player characters and monsters.

TSR9449 – Corsairs of the Great Sea (1994)
The Al-Qadim Corsairs of the Great Sea boxed set, by Nicky Rea, contained an 8-page booklet with monsters.

All of the fictional creatures described in this set are included in the Monstrous Compendium Annual Volume Two, above, and are not reproduced here.

Planescape

TSR2600 – Planescape Campaign Setting (1994)
The Planescape Campaign Setting boxed set contained a 32-page Monstrous Supplement booklet.

TSR2603 – Planes of Chaos (1994)
The Planescape Planes of Chaos boxed set contained a 32-page Monstrous Supplement booklet.

TSR2607 – Planes of Law (1995)
The Planescape Planes of Law boxed set contained a 32-page Monstrous Supplement booklet.

TSR2615 – Planes of Conflict (1995)
The Planescape Planes of Conflict boxed set contained a 32-page Monstrous Supplement booklet.

Dark Sun

TSR2400 – Dark Sun Campaign Setting (1991)
The original Dark Sun Boxed Set for the Dark Sun campaign setting contains several pages of monster description in The Wanderer's Journal book, as well as in the A Little Knowledge adventure booklet.

TSR2432 – City by the Silt Sea (1994)
The City by the Silt Sea campaign expansion box for the Dark Sun campaign setting by Shane Lacy Hensley contains a 32-page Monstrous Supplement.

TSR2437 – Thri-Kreen of Athas (1995)
The Dark Sun campaign setting accessory Thri-Kreen of Athas by Tim Beach and Dori Hein contained three monster descriptions.

TSR2438 – Dark Sun Campaign Setting (1995)
The expanded and revised Campaign setting boxed set for Dark Sun contained several pages of monster description in The Wanderer's Chronicle booklet.

TSR2444 – The Wanderer's Chronicle: Mind Lords of the Last Sea (1996)
The Wanderer's Chronicle: Mind Lords of the Last Sea by Matt Forbeck contained ten pages of descriptions of NPCs and monsters.

Birthright

TSR3100 – Birthright Campaign Setting (1995)
Within the Birthright Campaign Setting box were a set of cardsheets, separate from the books. Beyond rules summaries and handy charts, several unique monsters were presented.

Greyhawk

TSR11374 – The Scarlet Brotherhood (1999)
The Greyhawk campaign setting accessory The Scarlet Brotherhood, by Sean Reynolds, contained the descriptions of seven monsters.

Core AD&D sources

TSR9506 – Chronomancer (1995)
The Chronomancer game accessory, by Loren Coleman, contained 7 pages of monsters living on Temporal Prime, a fictitious dimension that allows time travel.

All of the fictional creatures described in this accessory were included in the Monstrous Compendium Annual Volume Three, above, and are not reproduced here.

TSR9539 – The Sea Devils (1997)
The Sea Devils game accessory by Skip Williams, detailing the sahuagin in the Monstrous Arcana series, contained two pages detailing new aquatic monsters.

TSR9569 – The Illithiad (1998)
The Illithiad game accessory by Bruce R. Cordell, in the Monstrous Arcana series, contained 7 pages of monsters linked to the illithids.

Dragon Magazine
Dragon Magazine introduced many new monsters to the Advanced Dungeons & Dragons game.

References

 
Dungeons and Dragons